"Shimmy a Go Go" is song by Australian pop punk band, Short Stack, released September 2008 as their debut and lead single from their debut studio album, Stack Is the New Black. "Shimmy a Go Go" peaked at #31 on the ARIA Singles Chart. Shaun Diviney stated in a radio interview that he wrote the song during his final year in high school and it is about partying and having a good time.

Track listings

Charts

Personnel
Short Stack
Shaun Diviney – guitar, vocals
Andy Clemmensen – bass guitar, vocals
Bradie Webb – drums, keyboards

References

2008 singles
2008 debut singles
Short Stack songs
2008 songs